is a Super NES video game that was released in 1992. The game's full Japanese name is Ultimate Football: Try Formation!.

Summary

The actual gameplay takes place in a playoffs system of a fictional American football league. Gameplay involves the usual football fare of choosing a play and attempting to execute it. On offense, when throwing the football, a meter appears which measures the strength of the passer's throw. On defense, the player controls a defensive player and tries to tackle the opposing ball carrier or attempt to break up a pass play. There is an option to either play with or without background music.

There are two conferences: the United States Football Conference (USFC) and the American All-Star Football Conference (AAFC). Even though the teams are fictional, they use the cities of the actual NFL teams of the early 1990s. Passwords allow saved games to be restored while a news report is made after each game through the fictional cable television network ZIFN.

References

1992 video games
American football video games
Sammy games
Super Nintendo Entertainment System games
Super Nintendo Entertainment System-only games
Multiplayer and single-player video games
Video games developed in Japan
Video games scored by Megumi Matsūra